The women's time trial was held on 21 March on a 29 km course on the St Kilda Foreshore and Beach Road.

Results

External links
 Results

Cycling at the 2006 Commonwealth Games
2006 in women's road cycling
Road cycling at the Commonwealth Games